The 1969 Pittsburgh Steelers season was the franchise's 37th in the National Football League. It would mark a turning point of the Steelers franchise. 1969 was the first season for Hall of Fame head coach Chuck Noll, the first season for defensive lineman "Mean Joe" Greene and L. C. Greenwood, the first season for longtime Steelers public relations director Joe Gordon, and the team's last season in Pitt Stadium before moving into then-state-of-the-art Three Rivers Stadium the following season.

Although considered a turning point in the team's history, the results were not immediate; after winning the season opener against the Detroit Lions, the Steelers lost every game afterwards to finish 1–13. The Steelers became the first team in NFL history since the 1936 Philadelphia Eagles to win its season opener and lose every remaining game. This feat would later be matched by the 2001 Carolina Panthers and the 2020 Jacksonville Jaguars, both teams won their season openers but went on to lose their remaining games. The Steelers finished 1969 4th in the NFL Century Division and tied with the Chicago Bears for last in the NFL. With the Steelers finishing 1–6 at Pitt Stadium, it marked the last time the Steelers finished the season with a losing record at home until 1999.

As a result of their 1–13 records, Art Rooney of the Steelers won a coin toss with George Halas of the Bears to determine who would select Louisiana Tech quarterback Terry Bradshaw (the consensus number 1 selection among league teams) with the number one pick in the 1970 draft. By modern NFL tiebreaking rules, the Steelers would have automatically been given the first pick anyway, as the Bears' one win came against the Steelers in Week 8.

Offseason
In the 1969 offseason, the Steelers hired former defensive coordinator Chuck Noll from the Baltimore Colts days after his loss to the New York Jets in Super Bowl III. Noll became the team's 14th head coach in the franchise's history. While it took 36 seasons to go through the first 13, Noll stayed through 1991, establishing coaching stability for the Steelers not seen in other NFL franchises for the next 46. Since Noll's retirement, only Bill Cowher and current head coach Mike Tomlin have served as head coach of the Steelers.

According to Linebacker Andy Russell and other Steelers present, Noll assembled the team for their first meeting and plainly stated his thoughts on why the Steelers had lost so often for so long.

"So Coach Noll's first meeting, I'll never forget the speech he gave," said Russell, who became a highly successful businessman after retiring from football in 1976. "He gets up and says, 'I've been watching the game film since I took the job, and I can tell you guys why you've been losing.' You could have heard a pin drop in that room. He says, 'The reason you have been losing is you're not any good.'" he said, 'I'm going to get rid of most of you.' Five of us made it from that room to the Super Bowl in '74."

Only a handful of players were carried over from the 1968 squad to the 1974 Super Bowl Squad, most notably veterans Andy Russell, Rocky Bleier, Ray Mansfield, Sam Davis and Bobby Walden. Additionally, Dick Hoak, who retired before the 1972 season, became the team's running backs coach and remained with the team in that capacity through the 2006 season. Bleier, who played his rookie season the year before and later became a major contributor to the Super Bowl championship teams, was fighting in Vietnam during this time and was wounded in combat just before the start of the season.

1969 NFL Draft

Although the Pittsburgh Steelers missed out on Heisman Trophy winner O. J. Simpson, Chuck Noll used the 1st Round pick wisely by drafting North Texas State Defensive tackle, Joe Greene. Noll said years later that Greene would've been selected even if they had the top overall pick, passing over Simpson. Although Simpson went on to a Hall of Fame career before legal troubles overshadowed his NFL accomplishments, Steeler scouting set the standard excellent NFL scouting in the draft for years to come.

Greene's selection was not without controversy. The front page of the Pittsburgh Post-Gazette the next morning had a headline posted Who's Joe Greene?, owing to his relative obscurity despite being named a consensus All-American selection his senior year. The team also drafted Greene's defensive line mate, Arkansas AM&N defensive end L. C. Greenwood, in the tenth round. Greene and Greenwood formed the core of the famed Steel Curtain defensive line and played their entire career as teammates, with both retiring at the end of the 1981 season. The following year, Noll switched the team to a 3–4 defense, partially as a result of the retirement of two of his best defensive players.

Selecting Greene was wise. He was the 1969 Defensive Rookie of the Year at season's end.

Joe Gordon was hired as the team's public relations director. Though his role was more behind-the-scenes, he would remain with the team in that capacity through the 1998 season, second only to Dick Hoak in terms of tenure with the team outside of the Rooney family, third counting Steelers radio commentator Myron Cope, who was not employed by the team but was associated with it through WTAE Radio and later WDVE on the official Steelers radio network.

Among the more notable undrafted free agents on the training camp roster was defensive lineman Ed O'Neill from Youngstown State. Although he didn't make the team, O'Neill would go on to fame as an actor, most notably as Al Bundy on the TV series Married... with Children, which locally aired on WPGH-TV.

Roster

Regular season

Summary
The 1969 Season started off well for the Steelers. After defeating the Detroit Lions 16–13, much of the roster believed they were on a Super Bowl run. However, after losing three straight times, first at Philadelphia 41–27, then at home against the Cardinals 27–14, and at New York against the Giants 10–7, team morale plummeted. The Steelers then lost the next 10 games and became the first team in league history since the 1936 Philadelphia Eagles to win their season opener but then lose every other game until the 2001 Carolina Panthers. Though after these losses, Art Rooney Sr. still had faith in Chuck Noll, and retained him for 1970. With the 1–13 record, the Steelers won a coin toss against the Chicago Bears (who were also 1-13) and for the first time since 1956, the Steelers got the 1st Pick in the NFL Draft. With the pick, the team's draft brought improvement with #1 pick Louisiana Tech quarterback Terry Bradshaw.

Schedule

Game summaries

Week 1 (Sunday September 21, 1969): Detroit Lions

at Pitt Stadium, Pittsburgh, Pennsylvania
 Game time: 1:00 PM EST
 Game weather: 80 degrees Fahrenheit and sunny at kickoff
 Game attendance: 51,360
 Referee: Pat Haggerty
 TV announcers:

Scoring Drives:
 Detroit – FG Mann 23 yds, 0–3
 Pittsburgh – FG Mingo 27 yds, 3–3
 Pittsburgh – FG Mingo 18 yds, 6–3
 Pittsburgh – FG Mingo 40 yds, 9–3
 Detroit – FG Mann 23 yds, 9–6
 Detroit – McCullouch 12 yd pass from Munson (Mann kick), 9–13
 Pittsburgh – Bankston 6 yd run (Mingo kick), 16–13

Steelers running back Warren Bankston fumbled twice but turned out to be the game's hero by scoring a 6-yard touchdown with just 3 minutes to play.   On the touchdown, he broke attempted tackles by Wayne Walker and Mike Weger. Detroit's last drive was snuffed out by the Steelers on a fourth and one play that failed at the Lions' 36 yard line. Bankston ran for 52 yards in the game.

Week 2 (Sunday September 28, 1969): Philadelphia Eagles

at Franklin Field, Philadelphia
 Game time:
 Game weather:
 Game attendance: 60,658
 Referee: Bernie Ulman
 TV announcers:

Scoring Drives:
 Pittsburgh – FG Mingo 36 yds, 3–0
 Pittsburgh – Gros 8 yd pass from Shiner (Mingo kick), 10–0
 Pittsburgh – FG Mingo 15 yds, 13–0
 Philadelphia – Hawkins 28 yd pass from Snead (Baker kick), 13–7
 Philadelphia – FG Baker 35 yds, 10–13
 Philadelphia – Hawkins 28 yd pass from Snead (Baker kick), 13–17
 Philadelphia – Hawkins 47 yd pass from Snead (Baker kick), 13–24
 Philadelphia – Hawkins 15 yd pass from Snead (Baker kick), 13–31
 Pittsburgh – Hoak 3 yd run (Mingo kick), 20–31
 Pittsburgh – Jefferson 14 yd pass from Shiner (Mingo kick), 27–31
 Philadelphia – FG Baker 41 yds, 27–34
 Philadelphia – Jackson 56 yd pass from Snead (Baker kick), 27–41

The Steelers fell apart after the first quarter. Roy Jefferson caught 7 passes for 123 and scored a touchdown.

Week 3 (Sunday October 5, 1969): St. Louis Cardinals

at Pitt Stadium, Pittsburgh, Pennsylvania
 Game time:
 Game weather:
 Game attendance: 45,011
 Referee: George Rennix
 TV announcers:

Scoring Drives:
 Pittsburgh – Jefferson 2 yd pass from Shiner (Mingo kick), 7–0
 St. Louis – FG Bakken 42 yds, 7–3
 St. Louis – Crenshaw 26 yd run (Bakken kick), 7–10
 St. Louis – FG Bakken 35 yds, 7–13
 St. Louis – Crenshaw 4 yd run (Bakken kick), 7–20
 Pittsburgh – Jefferson 48 yd pass from Nix (Mingo kick), 14–20
 St. Louis – Gilliam 58 yd pass from Hart (Bakken kick), 14–27

The Steelers committed 5 turnovers. Jefferson caught 9 passes for 115 yards and scored 2 touchdowns.

Week 4 at Giants

Week 5 (Saturday October 18, 1969): Cleveland Browns

at Cleveland Municipal Stadium, Cleveland, Ohio
 Game time:
 Game weather:
 Game attendance: 84,078
 Referee: Pat Haggerty
 TV announcers:

Scoring Drives:
 Cleveland – Collins 4 yd pass from Nelsen (Cockroft kick)0–7
 Pittsburgh – Hoak 4 yd run (Mingo kick)7–7
 Cleveland – Kelly 1 yd run (Cockroft kick)7–14
 Pittsburgh – FG Mingo 38 yds 10–14
 Cleveland - Barnes 55 yd interception return (Cockroft kick)10–21
 Cleveland – Sumner 40 yd interception return (Cockroft kick)10–28
 Cleveland - Collins 48 yd pass from Nelsen (Cockroft kick)10–35
 Pittsburgh – Gros 15 yd pass from Hanratty (Mingo kick)17–35
 Pittsburgh – Jefferson 10 yd pass from Nix (Mingo kick)24–35
 Cleveland – Morrison 1 yd run (Cockroft kick)24–42
 Pittsburgh – Jefferson 15 yd pass from Hanratty (Mingo kick)31–42

The bumbling Steelers gave away two touchdowns to the rival Browns on interception returns. With less than 7 minutes left to go in the 3rd Quarter, Steelers Quarterback Terry Hanratty was intercepted by Erich Barnes and then in the 4th by Walt Sumner. The 4th quarter was a wild affair with a combined 6 touchdowns scored. Roy Jefferson caught 7 passes for 110 yards and 2 touchdowns. The Steelers used two other quarterbacks besides Hanratty (Dick Shiner and Kent Nix).

Week 6 (Sunday October 26, 1969): Washington Redskins

at Pitt Stadium, Pittsburgh, Pennsylvania
 Game time:
 Game weather:
 Game attendance: 46,557
 Referee: Tommy Bell
 TV announcers:

Scoring Drives:
 Pittsburgh – Gros 8 yd pass from Hanratty (Mingo kick), 7–0
 Washington – Jurgensen 10 yd run (Knight kick), 7–7
 Washington – Taylor 17 yd pass from Jurgensen (Knight kick), 7–14

The game was designated as Steeler Alumni Day and before the game, wounded Vietnam Veteran Rocky Bleier, using a cane, walked across the field to a standing ovation from the crowd of 46,000. The Steelers defense played well enough to keep the team in the game but the offense could find no traction. The game would feature the only head-to-head matchup between Noll and Vince Lombardi as head coaches, as Lombardi died of cancer less than a year later.

Week 7 (Sunday November 2, 1969): Green Bay Packers

at Pitt Stadium, Pittsburgh, Pennsylvania
 Game time:
 Game weather:
 Game attendance: 46,403
 Referee: Bernie Ulman
 TV announcers:

Scoring Drives:
 Pittsburgh – FG Mingo 19 yds, 3–0
 Pittsburgh – Jefferson 38 yd pass from Hanratty (Mingo kick), 10–0
 Green Bay – Horn 2 yd run (Mercer kick), 10–7
 Green Bay – T. Williams 83 yd punt return (Mercer kick), 10–14
 Pittsburgh – Hoak 3 yd pass from Hanratty (Mingo kick), 17–14
 Pittsburgh – Williams 6 yd pass from Hanratty (Mingo kick), 24–14
 Green Bay – FG Mercer 15 yds, 24–17
 Green Bay – T. Williams 96 yd kickoff return (Mercer kick), 24–24
 Pittsburgh – Jefferson 53 yd pass from Shiner (Mingo kick), 31–24
 Pittsburgh – FG Mingo 32 yds, 34–24
 Green Bay – Dale 43 yd pass from Starr (Mercer kick), 34–31
 Green Bay – Starr 1 yd run (Mercer Kick), 34–38

The Steelers defense forced 5 turnovers and held the vaunted Packers running game to less than 100 yards. The offense gained more total yards than the Packers. The improved play kept  Pittsburgh in the see-saw game but it wasn't enough. Jefferson shined again by catching 7 passes for 167 yards and two scores.  The Steelers could not find a solution for the Packers Carroll Dale, who had similar statistics. The Packers Travis Williams had a spectacular game, scoring two touchdowns on a punt return and a kickoff return. Bart Starr sat out more than half the game, nursing a sore shoulder, but came into the game in relief of Dan Horn to lead the Packers.

Week 8 (Sunday November 9, 1969): Chicago Bears

at Wrigley Field, Chicago
 Game time:
 Game weather:
 Game attendance: 45,856
 Referee: Fred Silva
 TV announcers:

Scoring Drives:
 Chicago – Piccolo 25 yd pass from Douglass (Percival kick), 0–7
 Chicago – Safety, Hanratty tackled in end zone by O'Bradovich, 0–9
 Chicago – Sayers 2 yd run (Percival kick), 0–16
 Chicago – FG Percival 27 yds, 0–19
 Chicago – Wallace 12 yd pass from Douglass (Percival kick), 0–26
 Chicago – FG Percival 35 yds, 0–29
 Chicago – Safety, Shiner tackled in end zone by Butkus, 0–31
 Chicago – Sayers, 1 yd run (Percival kick), 0–38
 Pittsburgh – Gros 2 yd run (Mingo kick), 7–38

Sacked 8 times, twice for safeties, Dick Shiner and Terry Hanratty were terrorized by Dick Butkus and his defense, giving the Bears their only win in 1969. This would be the last game the Steelers would play at Wrigley Field and it also was Brian Piccolo's last home game for the Bears. He was diagnosed with cancer later that month and died in June 1970.

Week 9 (Sunday November 16, 1969): Cleveland Browns

at Pitt Stadium, Pittsburgh, Pennsylvania
 Game time:
 Game weather:
 Game attendance: 47,670
 Referee: George Rennix
 TV announcers:

Scoring Drives:
 Cleveland – Collins 26 yd pass from Nelsen (Cockroft kick), 0–7
 Pittsburgh – FG Mingo 31 yds, 3–7
 Cleveland – FG Cockroft 28 yds, 3–10
 Cleveland – Warfield 12 yd pass from Nelsen (Cockroft kick), 3–17
 Cleveland – Kelly 1 yd run (Cockroft kick), 3–24

Warren Bankston gained 96 yards while Roy Jefferson, going into the game as the NFL's leading receiver, was bottled up all day in double coverage. Former Steeler turned Browns QB Bill Nelsen turned crucial plays into completed passes to Paul Warfield to pace the Browns.

Week 10 (Sunday November 23, 1969): Minnesota Vikings

at Metropolitan Stadium, Bloomington, Minnesota
 Game time:
 Game weather:
 Game attendance: 47,202
 Referee: Pat Haggerty
 TV announcers:

Scoring Drives:
 Minnesota – Krause 77 yd interception return (Cox kick), 0–7
 Minnesota – FG Cox 22 yds, 0–10
 Pittsburgh – McCall 101 yd kickoff return (Mingo kick), 7–10
 Minnesota – Brown 1 yd run (Cox kick), 7–17
 Minnesota – Henderson 28 yd pass from Cuozzo (Cox kick), 7–24
 Pittsburgh – Henderson 10 yd pass from Hanratty (Mingo kick), 14–24
 Minnesota – Beasley 60 yd fumble return (Cox kick), 14–31
 Minnesota – Reed 6 yd pass from Cuozzo (Cox kick), 14–38
 Minnesota – Reed 1 yd run (Cox kick), 14–45
 Minnesota – Henderson 7 yd pass from Lee (Cox kick), 14–52

For the third straight week, the Steelers were embarrassed and never in the game. The Vikings scored on an interception return, a fumble return, three passes and two runs. The fumble return came after Charlie West fumbled a kickoff and John Beasley picked up the ball and
ran 60 yards for a score. Joe Greene, the Steelers rookie (and future Hall of Famer) was thrown out of the game after losing his temper.

Week 11 (Sunday November 30, 1969): St. Louis Cardinals

at Busch Memorial Stadium, St. Louis, Missouri
 Game time:
 Game weather:
 Game attendance: 43,721
 Referee: Jim Tunney
 TV announcers:

Scoring Drives:
 St. Louis – Williams 7 yd pass from Hart (kick blocked), 0–6
 St. Louis – FG Bakken 32 yds, 0–9
 Pittsburgh – FG Mingo 19 yds, 3–9
 St. Louis – FG Bakken 12 yds, 3–12
 St. Louis – Edwards 2 yd run (Bakken kick), 3–19
 St. Louis – Williams 5 yd pass from Hart (Bakken kick), 3–26
 St. Louis – Williams 9 yd pass from Hart (Bakken kick), 3–33
 St. Louis – Hart 1 yd run (Bakken kick), 3–40
 St. Louis – Shivers 1 yd run (Bakken kick), 3–47
 Pittsburgh – Henderson 20 yd pass from Hanratty (Mingo kick), 10–47

The Steelers were beaten to a pulp as St Louis out gained them 401 to 187 yards. In the last four games the Steelers were outscored 161 to 34.

Week 12 (Sunday December 7, 1969): Dallas Cowboys

at Pitt Stadium, Pittsburgh, Pennsylvania
 Game time:
 Game weather:'Pouring rain, cold, muddy, ugly day.  I was there.  Game attendance: 24,990
 Referee: Bernie Ulman
 TV announcers:

Scoring Drives:
 Dallas – FG M. Clark 32 yds, 0–3
 Dallas – Morton 12 yd run (M. Clark kick), 0–10
 Pittsburgh – Henderson 29 yd pass from Shiner (Mingo kick), 7–10

The Steelers bounced back with an impressive effort against the powerhouse Cowboys at home. Dallas was playing to clinch a playoff spot  but they had to battle through a mud bog to earn the prize. What turned out to be the winning field goal was set up by a punt return from Mel Renfro. The Steelers didn't cross midfield until the 4th quarter as snow began to fall. They kept the game close until Dick Shiner came off the bench and led them to a touchdown drive. A drive sputtered out with less than 2 minutes left but the Steelers got yet another chance. Shiner hit Roy Jefferson on a long pass to the Dallas 20 yard line but the game ended.

Week 13 (Sunday December 14, 1969): New York Giantsat Pitt Stadium, Pittsburgh, Pennsylvania Game time:
 Game weather:
 Game attendance: 21,067
 Referee: Fred Silva
 TV announcers: Jack Buck, Jack Whitaker CBS

Scoring Drives:
 New York Giants – Koy 34 yd pass from Tarkenton (Gogolak kick), 0–7
 Pittsburgh – Jefferson 15 yd pass from Shiner (Mingo kick), 7–7
 Pittsburgh – Jefferson 9 yd pass from Shiner (Mingo kick), 14–7
 New York Giants – Morrison 10 yd pass form Tarkenton (Gogolak kick), 14–14
 Pittsburgh – FG Mingo 41 yds, 17–14
 New York Giants – Koy 4 yd pass from Tarkenton (Gogolak kick), 17–21

Returning to his earlier season form, Roy Jefferson caught 5 passes for 112 yards and 2 touchdowns but the Giants' Fran Tarkenton was masterful in throwing three touchdowns. In their final game at Pitt Stadium, the Steelers were in control of the game and seemed poised to win but were undone after Giants punter Dave Dunaway ran instead of punting and gained a first down for the New Yorkers. With the game on the line and the Steelers leading, Tarkenton faked a handoff to the middle of the line and then threw the ball to Ernie Koy, who was not covered by a defender. The hard luck Steelers left the muddy and snowy field as losers again.

Week 14 (Sunday December 21, 1969): New Orleans Saintsat Tulane Stadium, New Orleans, Louisiana''
 Game time: 1:00 p.m. CST
 Game weather: Game attendance: 72,256
 Referee: Fred Swearingen
 TV announcers:Scoring Drives:'''
 Pittsburgh – Gros 8 yd run (Mingo kick), 7–0
 Pittsburgh – Gros 16 yd run (Mingo kick), 14–0
 New Orleans – Poage 3 yd pass from Kilmer (Dempsey kick), 14–7
 New Orleans – FG Dempsey 38 yds, 14–10
 New Orleans – Poage 3 yd pass from Kilmer (Dempsey kick), 14–17
 Pittsburgh – Gros 7 yd run (Mingo kick), 21–17
 Pittsburgh – FG Mingo 11 yds, 24–17
 New Orleans – FG Dempsey 40 yds, 24–20
 New Orleans – Livingston 3 yd run (Dempsey kick), 24–27

Earl Gros, a Louisiana native who played at LSU, ran for 3 touchdowns but the Steelers blew a 14-point lead to a Saints team that had not been in existence four years earlier.

The Steelers did not return to New Orleans until 1974, when they defeated the Saints in the regular season, then ousted the Minnesota Vikings in Super Bowl IX seven weeks later.

Standings

References

External links
 1969 Pittsburgh Steelers season at Profootballreference.com 
 1969 Pittsburgh Steelers season statistics at jt-sw.com

Pittsburgh Steelers seasons
Pittsburgh Steelers
Pittsburgh Steel